Alena Sergeyevna Kostornaia (born 24 August 2003) is a Russian figure skater. She is the 2020 European champion, the 2019–20 Grand Prix Final champion, a six-time Grand Prix medalist (including gold at the 2019 Internationaux de France and the 2019 NHK Trophy), and the 2019 CS Finlandia Trophy champion. Competing domestically, she is a three-time Russian senior national medalist (silver 2020, bronze 2018 and 2019). She previously held the world record for the highest senior short program score in women's skating. 

At the junior level, Kostornaia is the 2018 Junior World silver medalist, the 2018–19 Junior Grand Prix Final champion, the 2017–18 Junior Grand Prix Final silver medalist, and a two-time Russian junior national silver medalist (2018, 2019). She currently holds the world record for the highest junior short program score in women's skating.

Kostornaia is the tenth woman in history to have landed the triple Axel jump in a senior international competition. Kostornaia is the third woman after teammate Elizaveta Tuktamysheva and Rika Kihira of Japan to attempt and land the maximum number of triple jumps allowed in one senior international competition: four in the short program and eight in the free skate (see Zayak rule). She first accomplished this at the 2019 Internationaux de France, and later landed all twelve triples cleanly at the 2019–20 Grand Prix Final.

Personal life 
Kostornaia was born on 24 August 2003 in Moscow to parents Sergei and Tatiana. She has a younger brother, Stepan. Although she registers her name as "Alena" with the ISU, Kostornaia uses the romanization of "Aliona" on her official Instagram account. In a May 2020 Q&A with former teammate Anna Shcherbakova, Kostornaia stated that she wants to become a neurosurgeon once she retires from figure skating.

In her free time, Kostornaia enjoys horseback riding and as such often receives horse and unicorn stuffed toys from fans. She also has a number of pets, including a rabbit gifted to her by her fans, a cat, and a Maltipoo named Audrey.

As of September 2021, Kostornaia is a student at the Russian State University of Physical Education, Sport, Youth and Tourism where she is studying psychology.

Career

Early years 
Kostornaia began learning to skate in 2007. Her parents initially put her in skating as a way to channel her energy. From 2012 to 2017, she was coached by Elena Zhgun in Moscow.

Kostornaia sustained an injury in 2016. She finished 16th at the 2017 Russian Junior Championships. Eteri Tutberidze and Sergei Dudakov became her coaches in 2017.

2017–2018 season: Junior international debut 
Kostornaia's international debut was in early October 2017, at a 2017–18 ISU Junior Grand Prix (JGP) competition in Gdańsk, Poland; ranked first in the short program and second in the free skate, she won the gold medal by a margin of 1.36 points over the silver medalist, her training partner Daria Panenkova. She won silver behind Sofia Samodurova at JGP Italy by a margin of 0.04 points. Her placements qualified her for the 2017–18 Junior Grand Prix of Figure Skating Final, where she won silver, placing second in the short program and first in the free skate. At the senior level, Kostornaia won bronze at the 2018 Russian Figure Skating Championships. She later won silver at the 2018 Russian Junior Championships behind teammate Alexandra Trusova by a margin of 0.58 points.

In March 2018, Kostornaia competed at the 2018 World Junior Championships. She placed second in the short program and the free skate, winning the silver medal behind Trusova.

2018–2019 season: Junior Grand Prix Final champion 

Kostornaia learned to perform a triple Axel in the preceding year, and originally planned to introduce it in competition. However, she lost the jump following growth during the offseason. Kostornaia started her season by competing in the 2018 JGP series. She won the gold medal at her first JGP event of the season in Linz, Austria. She was ranked first in both the short program and the free skate and won the gold medal by a margin of more than 11 points over the silver medalist, her teammate Alena Kanysheva.

She skated her second JGP event of the season at JGP Ostrava, where she again placed first in both the short program and the free skate. She won the gold medal by a margin of about 2 points over the silver medalist, Kim Ye-lim. With two JGP victories, she qualified for the 2018–19 Junior Grand Prix Final, where she won the gold medal after placing first in both the short program and the free skate. She outscored her teammate and training partner Trusova by about 2.5 points. At this event, Kostornaia scored her personal best score of 217.98 points, and also set a new junior-level ladies' record for the short program (76.32 points).

At the 2019 Russian Championships, Kostornaia placed third in the short program due to a fall during her step sequence, which she attributed to being "too relaxed" as she was nearing the end of the program and had already completed all of her jumping passes. She then placed third in the free skate as well, winning her second consecutive national bronze medal.

Kostornaia participated in the 2019 Russian Junior Championships, winning the short program and placing second in the free skate. She placed second overall, winning her second consecutive junior national silver medal. After the event, she was named to the Russian team for the 2019 World Junior Championships along with training mates Trusova and Anna Shcherbakova. However, on 4 March, the first day of the event, Kostornaia withdrew from the competition due to a medical condition, subsequently revealed by choreographer Daniil Gleikhengauz to be leg inflammation that required four weeks away from training. She was replaced by Ksenia Sinitsyna.

2019–2020 season: Undefeated senior international debut and European title 

For her programs, Kostornaia retained her short program from the previous season and revised a Twilight–themed exhibition program from the previous year to serve as her free skate, citing how much she enjoyed skating it. Shortly after debuting her programs at the Russian test skates, Kostornaia resumed training the triple Axel jump. Kostornaia debuted on the senior international level  at the 2019 CS Finlandia Trophy, where she placing first in both the short program and free skate. She incorporated two triple Axels in her free skate, becoming the tenth woman in history to land the jump in an international competition, and earned a total combined score of 234.84, 22.31 points ahead of silver medalist Elizaveta Tuktamysheva.

Making her senior Grand Prix debut at the 2019 Internationaux de France, Kostornaia ranked first in the short program, incorporating a triple Axel into it for the first time. She then became the fourth woman ever, after Mao Asada, Rika Kihira and Elizaveta Tuktamysheva, to land two fully rotated triple Axels in a free skate, placing first in the segment with a personal best score of 159.45 points. She took the gold medal over training mate and reigning World and Olympic champion Alina Zagitova by a margin of 19.94 points. At the 2019 NHK Trophy, Kostornaia performed a clean skate with a successful triple Axel to place first in the short program, 5.15 points over Rika Kihira, who also landed a triple Axel, and set a new world record score of 85.04 for the ladies' short program at the senior level. In the free, she again placed first and won the event with a personal best total score of 240.00. Kostornaia became the top qualifier for the Grand Prix Final in Torino, with two gold medal finishes and 30 points overall.

At the 2019–20 Grand Prix Final, she broke her own world record by scoring 85.45 points in the short program, placing first. In spite of having the only clean free skate amongst the ladies, Kostornaia ranked second in that segment, 0.51 point behind teammate Anna Shcherbakova. However, her lead from the short program was enough to not only win the title by almost 7 points over Shcherbakova, but also to break the world record for the combined total score in ladies' singles skating, previously held by Alexandra Trusova. She became the fifth figure skater in any discipline to win the Junior Grand Prix Final and Grand Prix Final in consecutive years.

Kostornaia competed next at the 2020 Russian National championships, where she again won the short program, setting a ten-point lead over second-place Anna Shcherbakova. However, she placed second in the free skate, due to mistakes on her double Axel and triple flip-triple toe loop combination. She received the silver medal, two points behind Shcherbakova, and secured a spot on the European and World teams.

At the 2020 European Championships, Kostornaia was in the lead following a clean short program. She placed second in the free skate behind Shcherbakova, receiving a deduction for falling on her last jumping pass, a triple Lutz, but still scored enough to claim the European title by three points. Upon being interviewed after her victory, she expressed surprise at the results, as she had not expected to win in light of the mistake.

After the 2020 World Championships were cancelled over concern about the COVID-19 pandemic, Kostornaia officially ended her season undefeated at every international competition of her senior debut.

2020–2021 season: Coaching changes and COVID-19 

On 31 July 2020, it was announced by Russian media outlet R-Sport that Kostornaia had chosen to part ways with coach Eteri Tutberidze to train in the camp of coach Evgeni Plushenko. This news was first reported by Tutberidze herself via Instagram where she claimed that the split was due to Kostornaia's refusal to share the ice with other teammates. Kostornaia herself initially declined to comment on her departure. Although she left Tutberidze with two new programs set, including a new free program to three variations of Lovely by Billie Eilish and Khalid, Plushenko stated in an interview with TASS that he and his team would set two more new programs for Kostornaia for the season, potentially with international choreographers. While her new short program ended up being choreographed by her coach, Sergei Rozanov, her new free program was choreographed remotely by Canadian former ice dancer and choreographer Shae-Lynn Bourne due to COVID-19 travel restrictions.

At the 2020 Russian test skate event, Kostornaia only performed her short program as her free program was not finalized due to limited training time. Her coach, Evgeni Plushenko, also stated that Kostornaia was recovering from an unspecified injury and had not yet returned to top form. Due to the injury and late coaching change, Kostornaia was assigned to the final two events in the 2020–21 Russian Cup series, a domestic competition series used to determine qualification to the Russian Figure Skating Championships. She was also assigned to compete at the 2020 Rostelecom Cup.

Kostornaia opened her competitive season at the fourth stage of the domestic Russian Cup series held in Kazan, Russia on 8 November. She won the short program by a small margin over teammate Alexandra Trusova with a score of 78.15, despite a step-out on her triple flip-triple toe loop combination and a loss of control on her Biellmann spin. In the free skate, she placed second behind Trusova and won the silver medal overall. At the 2020 Rostelecom Cup, Kostornaia cleanly skated her short program and placed first in that segment with a score of 78.84 points, four points ahead of Elizaveta Tuktamysheva, who performed a triple Axel but made an error executing her combination.  She dropped to the silver medal position behind Tuktamysheva in the free skate, after underrotating three triple jumps and losing levels on several non-jump elements.  She remarked afterward: "you need jumps like the triple Axel and quads to compete at the highest level, so it is in my plans and I'm working towards that."

On 4 December, it was announced that Kostornaia had withdrawn from the fifth stage of the Russian Cup after contracting COVID-19. Kostornaia later withdrew from the 2021 Russian Championships on 22 December due to lack of training time caused by her recovery from the virus. On 19 January 2021, it was announced that Kostornaia was selected to participate in the Channel One Russia Figure Skating Cup, a domestic team tournament featuring six skaters or teams in each discipline, competing against one another in teams of three. Kostornaia earned her place in the event because of the strength of her performance at the 2020 European Championships as she was unable to perform at the 2021 national championships, and was chosen to compete alongside fellow top contenders Anna Shcherbakova, Alexandra Trusova, Elizaveta Tuktamysheva, Daria Usacheva, and Kamila Valieva. She later withdrew from the event on 3 February due to incomplete recovery from COVID-19.

Kostornaia announced on Instagram on 28 January that she had developed a new free program, again choreographed by Shae-Lynn Bourne. Vice President of the ISU Alexander Lakernik visited one of Kostornaia's training sessions to help polish the program. In addition to her new free skate to "My Way" and "Yellow Moon" by Luca D'Alberto, Kostornaia also debuted a new short program to Antonio Vivaldi's The Four Seasons: Winter at the 2021 Russian Cup Final.  The Final was widely perceived as a contest between Kostornaia and Elizaveta Tuktamysheva for the third spot on the Russian ladies' team for the 2021 World Championships in Stockholm. She struggled in the short at the event, only executing a tight double toe loop after a messy landing on the triple flip in her intended triple flip-triple-toe loop combination, placing sixth in the segment. She maintained her standing in the free skate to finish sixth overall, two placements below Tuktamysheva. The Final marked the end to Kostornaia's competitive season as Tuktamysheva was named to the World Championship team on 1 March.

On 3 March, it was reported by TASS that Kostornaia was in the process of negotiating a return to her former coach, Eteri Tutberidze, pending agreement from Tutberidze herself. When asked about the transfer, Kostornaia would neither confirm or deny the rumors. Sports.ru also reported on the situation with the additional detail that Tutberidze was hesitant to accept due to doubts that Kostornaia would be able to regain her previous form after struggling with a back injury and a stress fracture on her leg. On 6 March, it was announced that Tutberidze had accepted Kostornaia back into her group for a two-month probationary period, during which Kostornaia would have to adhere completely to the team's training regimen and regain her triple Axel in order to continue permanently.

Due to her struggles during the 2020–21 season, Kostornaia was excluded from Russian national team for the 2021–22 season and was instead named to the reserve team as first alternate. Main national team members and reserve team members receive the same amount of funding from the Russian Figure Skating Federation, with the primary difference between the two being the amount of funds allocated to the skater's club.

2021–2022 season: Final season with Tutberidze
Kostornaia debuted her programs for the Olympic season at the 2021 Russian test skate event where she attempted the triple Axel again for the first time since the 2019–20 season. She landed one of her two attempts cleanly. At her first international assignment of the season, the 2021 CS Finlandia Trophy, Kostornaia did not attempt the triple Axel in the short program, opting instead to skate cleanly under the advisement of her coaches, and placed second in the segment behind Russian teammate Elizaveta Tuktamysheva. In the free program, Kostornaia struggled with her technical elements, placing fourth in the segment, but managed to remain on the podium, winning the bronze medal behind training mates Kamila Valieva and Tuktamysheva.

Due to travel restrictions related to the COVID-19 pandemic, there was concern that Kostornaia, along with several other members of the Russian delegation, would not receive her travel visa in time to compete at her first Grand Prix assignment of the season, the 2021 Skate Canada International. Fortunately, Kostornaia and her compatriots received their passports and visas on 25 October, just four days before the start of the competition. On 26 October, it was announced by Match TV that Kostornaia had chosen to change both of her programs in advance of Skate Canada, switching to a short program set to "New York, New York", and revisiting the free skate choreographer Daniil Gleikhengauz had originally set for her for the 2020–21 season to three variations of Billie Eilish and Khalid's "Lovely."

At Skate Canada, Kostornaia placed third in the short program. She attempted and landed her triple Axel, though it was called on the quarter, and trailed behind Valieva and Tuktamysheva. She was fourth in the free skate, but remained in third place overall. She said afterward that she had "made some errors, but was pleased with my results." At her second event, the 2021 Internationaux de France, Kostornaia skated a clean short program without a triple Axel. She attempted and fell on it in the free skate, but landed her other jumps, taking the silver medal. She skated the free skate with dramatic makeup she cited as a tribute to Billie Eilish, "who is also not afraid to look different than others, and I really relate to that". Due to her placements at her two Grand Prix assignments, Kostornaia qualified to the final women's spot in the 2021–22 Grand Prix Final, but the event was canceled due to travel restrictions related to the Omicron variant.

On 13 December 2021, it was announced by Sports.ru that Kostornaia had been forced to withdraw from the 2022 Russian Championships due to a hand fracture that would keep her off the ice for 20 days. She declined to comment on the injury, but her inability to compete was largely perceived by figures in Russian figure skating as the end to her bid to qualify to the Russian team for the 2022 Winter Olympics. Kostornaia later confirmed in a video on her YouTube channel that the injury was the result of a bad fall on a failed triple Axel attempt. She returned to training in February, where she suffered a new fracture in her left wrist while restoring her jumps. 

In an Instagram post made on 14 December, Kostornaia stated that she planned to continue to compete for another Olympic quadrennial. On 2 March 2022, Russian media outlet Sports.ru reported that Kostornaia had been asked to leave the Tutberidze training group by her coaches and would begin training under Elena Buianova. She commenced training with Buianova on 8 March.

2022–2023 season: Transition to pair skating 
On 7 August 2022, Kostornaia's coach, Elena Buyanova, announced that Kostornaia would undergo hip surgery on 8 August to repair an existing injury. The surgery was later delayed, and ultimately took place in September. In January 2023, Buyanova announced that she was no longer coaching Kostornaia, as the skater had opted to transition to pairs, teamed with Georgy Kunitsa and coached by Sergei Roslyakov.

Skating technique

Kostornaia's skating technique is distinguished by her strong program components, particularly her skating skills and artistic interpretation of her programs, combined with her ability to execute difficult technical elements, such as her now trademark triple Axel. Unlike her training-mates at Sambo-70, Kostornaia is often considered a product of the Elena Tchaikovskaia school of figure skating as her first coach, Elena Zhgun, was a student of Tchaikovskaia's and passed her knowledge of strong skating basics on to Kostornaia from a young age. She is often compared to her training-mates Anna Shcherbakova and Alexandra Trusova as the three entered the international junior and senior competitive circuits together and for many seasons were considered one another's primary rivals by both fans and specialists. Of the three (sometimes referred to as the 3A as their names all begin with the letter A), Kostornaia is widely considered the most artistic, with Trusova being her technical counterpart and Shcherbakova falling somewhere in the middle.

In 2019, Olympic champion Tara Lipinski referred to Kostornaia as part of the future hope of the Russian women's figure skating, singling her out as "a figure skater who proves that you can achieve technical excellence in landing triple axels and perhaps even quads in the near future. At the same time, she does not forget about basics such as balance which viewers of the sport admire as well as her presentation of fine emotional qualities in the execution of her programs."

Kostornaia has a history of increasing the difficulty of the technical elements in her programs to remain at the top of the ladies field. During the 2019–20 season, she began incorporating a triple Axel into her programs in order to compete with Shcherbakova and Trusova, who were both performing multiple quadruple jumps in their free programs. She has stated in the past that she hopes to eventually add a quad Salchow to her technical arsenal.

Public life 
Kostornaia is a two-time Silver Doe prize recipient (2019, 2020) for Best Sportsman of the Year. Silver Doe awards are presented annually by the Federation of Sports Journalists of Russia in recognition of distinguished athletic achievement.

In April 2020, Kostornaia was listed as a nominee for Forbes Russia's 30 Under 30 2020 list.

In July 2020, Kostornaia was named the inaugural recipient of the ISU Skating Awards prize for Best Newcomer, an award given to the most successful senior debutante in the 2019–20 season. Kostornaia was nominated for the award through popular vote by figure skating fans and then selected as the winner by a committee of judges.

Programs

Records and achievements

World record scores
Alena currently holds the junior world record for the short program.

Junior world record scores
Alena has set the junior world record scores 2 times under the current +5 / -5 GOE (Grade of Execution) system.

Historical world record scores
Note: Because of the introduction of the new +5 / -5 GOE (Grade of Execution) system which replaced the previous +3 / -3 GOE system, ISU has decided that all statistics start from zero for the season 2018–19. All previous records are now historical.

Competitive highlights 

GP: Grand Prix; JGP: Junior Grand Prix

Detailed results

Senior level

Personal bests highlighted in bold. World record scores are italicized.

Junior level 
Small medals for short and free programs awarded only at ISU Championships.
Current ISU world bests highlighted in bold and italic. Previous ISU world best highlighted in bold. Historical ISU world best highlighted in bold and italic. Personal bests highlighted in italic.

References

External links 
Official Instagram
Official YouTube channel
Official fan page on Instagram(teamkostornaya)
Official fan page on Instagram (kostornaia.team)
 

! colspan="3" style="border-top: 5px solid #78FF78;" |World Record Holders

! colspan="3" style="border-top: 5px solid #78FF78;" |World Junior Record Holders

! colspan="3" style="border-top: 5px solid #78FF78;" |Historical World Junior Record Holders (before season 2018–19)

2003 births
Russian female single skaters
World Junior Figure Skating Championships medalists
Season's world number one figure skaters
Living people
Figure skaters from Moscow
European Figure Skating Championships medalists
Female sports medalists